Danny Hynes of Houston is a top ranked air hockey player who has won eleven world titles and ten national titles.

References

External links 
 Air Hockey World Player-Profile Page for Danny Hynes

Sportspeople from Houston
Air hockey